David Moravec (born March 24, 1973 in Opava, Czechoslovakia) is a former professional ice hockey left wing who played for HC Oceláři Třinec of the Czech Extraliga and now works as a hockey coach.

He was drafted in the eighth round, 218th overall, by the Buffalo Sabres in the 1998 NHL Entry Draft. He played one game in the National Hockey League with the Sabres in the 1999–2000 season, going scoreless against the Detroit Red Wings.

Moravec was a member of the Czech team which won the gold medal at the 1998 Winter Olympics.

Career statistics

Regular season and playoffs

International

See also
List of players who played only one game in the NHL

External links

1973 births
Living people
Buffalo Sabres draft picks
Buffalo Sabres players
Czech ice hockey left wingers
Grizzlys Wolfsburg players
Czech expatriate ice hockey players in Russia
HC Havířov players
HC Oceláři Třinec players
HC Plzeň players
HC Slezan Opava players
HC Vítkovice players
HK Nitra players
MHk 32 Liptovský Mikuláš players
Hokej Šumperk 2003 players
HPK players
Ice hockey players at the 1998 Winter Olympics
Lokomotiv Yaroslavl players
Malmö Redhawks players
Medalists at the 1998 Winter Olympics
Olympic gold medalists for the Czech Republic
Olympic ice hockey players of the Czech Republic
Olympic medalists in ice hockey
Sportspeople from Opava
Czech expatriate ice hockey players in Germany
Czech expatriate ice hockey players in Slovakia
Czech expatriate ice hockey players in Sweden
Czech expatriate ice hockey players in the United States